James Robert Mackie (31 December 1889 – 20 March 1917) was an Australian rules footballer who played with Melbourne in the Victorian Football League (VFL). He was killed in action in World War I.

See also
 List of Victorian Football League players who died in active service

Sources
Holmesby, Russell & Main, Jim (2007). The Encyclopedia of AFL Footballers. 7th ed. Melbourne: Bas Publishing.

1889 births
1917 deaths
Military personnel from Melbourne
Australian rules footballers from Victoria (Australia)
Melbourne Football Club players
Australian military personnel killed in World War I